The 2014–15 Liga de Fútbol Profesional Boliviano season is the 38th season of LFPB.

Teams
The number of teams for 2014–15 remains the same. Aurora and Guabirá were relegated to the Liga Nacional B. They were replaced by the 2013–14 Liga Nacional B champion Universitario (P) and Petrolero.

Torneo Apertura

Standings

Results

Top goalscorers

Source: Soccerway.com

Torneo Clausura

Standings

Results

Top goalscorers
Through games played on 19 May 2015

Source: Soccerway.com

Relegation

Source:

Relegation/promotion playoff

Sport Boys remains at the season 2015–16 LFPB.

References

External links
 Official website of the LFPB 
 Official regulations 

2014
2014 in South American football leagues
2015 in South American football leagues
1